Pokrovka is the name of several  rural localities in Russia.

Altai Krai
As of 2010, nine rural localities in Altai Krai bear this name:
Pokrovka, Bayevsky District, Altai Krai, a selo in Nizhnechumansky Selsoviet of Bayevsky District
Pokrovka, Charyshsky District, Altai Krai, a selo in Senteleksky Selsoviet of Charyshsky District
Pokrovka, Klyuchevsky District, Altai Krai, a selo in Pokrovsky Selsoviet of Klyuchevsky District
Pokrovka, Loktevsky District, Altai Krai, a selo in Pokrovsky Selsoviet of Loktevsky District
Pokrovka, Mamontovsky District, Altai Krai, a selo in Pokrovsky Selsoviet of Mamontovsky District
Pokrovka, Pervomaysky District, Altai Krai, a settlement in Bayunovoklyuchevsky Selsoviet of Pervomaysky District
Pokrovka, Rodinsky District, Altai Krai, a selo in Pokrovsky Selsoviet of Rodinsky District
Pokrovka, Slavgorodsky District, Altai Krai, a selo in Pokrovsky Selsoviet of Slavgorodsky District
Pokrovka, Topchikhinsky District, Altai Krai, a selo in Pokrovsky Selsoviet of Topchikhinsky District

Amur Oblast
As of 2010, one rural locality in Amur Oblast bears this name:
Pokrovka, Amur Oblast, a selo in Nikoloalexandrovsky Rural Settlement of Oktyabrsky District

Astrakhan Oblast
As of 2010, one rural locality in Astrakhan Oblast bears this name:
Pokrovka, Astrakhan Oblast, a selo in Pokrovsky Selsoviet of Akhtubinsky District

Republic of Bashkortostan
As of 2010, nineteen rural localities in the Republic of Bashkortostan bear this name:
Pokrovka, Abzelilovsky District, Republic of Bashkortostan, a village in Krasnobashkirsky Selsoviet of Abzelilovsky District
Pokrovka, Aurgazinsky District, Republic of Bashkortostan, a village in Ismagilovsky Selsoviet of Aurgazinsky District
Pokrovka, Bakalinsky District, Republic of Bashkortostan, a village in Starosharashlinsky Selsoviet of Bakalinsky District
Pokrovka, Baymaksky District, Republic of Bashkortostan, a village in Zilairsky Selsoviet of Baymaksky District
Pokrovka, Belebeyevsky District, Republic of Bashkortostan, a village in Usen-Ivanovsky Selsoviet of Belebeyevsky District
Pokrovka, Blagoveshchensky District, Republic of Bashkortostan, a selo in Pokrovsky Selsoviet of Blagoveshchensky District
Pokrovka, Dyurtyulinsky District, Republic of Bashkortostan, a village in Mayadykovsky Selsoviet of Dyurtyulinsky District
Pokrovka, Fyodorovsky District, Republic of Bashkortostan, a village in Pokrovsky Selsoviet of Fyodorovsky District
Pokrovka, Iglinsky District, Republic of Bashkortostan, a village in Tavtimanovsky Selsoviet of Iglinsky District
Pokrovka, Karmaskalinsky District, Republic of Bashkortostan, a village in Karlamansky Selsoviet of Karmaskalinsky District
Pokrovka, Kuyurgazinsky District, Republic of Bashkortostan, a selo in Bakhmutsky Selsoviet of Kuyurgazinsky District
Pokrovka, Meleuzovsky District, Republic of Bashkortostan, a village in Korneyevsky Selsoviet of Meleuzovsky District
Pokrovka, Salavatsky District, Republic of Bashkortostan, a village in Maloyazovsky Selsoviet of Salavatsky District
Pokrovka, Sharansky District, Republic of Bashkortostan, a village in Michurinsky Selsoviet of Sharansky District
Pokrovka, Sterlibashevsky District, Republic of Bashkortostan, a village in Starokalkashevsky Selsoviet of Sterlibashevsky District
Pokrovka, Kuganaksky Selsoviet, Sterlitamaksky District, Republic of Bashkortostan, a selo in Kuganaksky Selsoviet of Sterlitamaksky District
Pokrovka, Naumovsky Selsoviet, Sterlitamaksky District, Republic of Bashkortostan, a village in Naumovsky Selsoviet of Sterlitamaksky District
Pokrovka, Tuymazinsky District, Republic of Bashkortostan, a village in Tyumenyakovsky Selsoviet of Tuymazinsky District
Pokrovka, Ufimsky District, Republic of Bashkortostan, a village in Cherkassky Selsoviet of Ufimsky District

Belgorod Oblast
As of 2010, three rural localities in Belgorod Oblast bear this name:
Pokrovka, Borisovsky District, Belgorod Oblast, a selo in Khotmyzhsky Rural Okrug of Borisovsky District
Pokrovka, Ivnyansky District, Belgorod Oblast, a selo in Ivnyansky District
Pokrovka, Volokonovsky District, Belgorod Oblast, a selo in Pokrovsky Rural Okrug of Volokonovsky District

Bryansk Oblast
As of 2010, three rural localities in Bryansk Oblast bear this name:
Pokrovka, Pochepsky District, Bryansk Oblast, a village in Papsuyevsky Selsoviet of Pochepsky District
Pokrovka, Surazhsky District, Bryansk Oblast, a village in Andreyevsky Selsoviet of Surazhsky District
Pokrovka, Vygonichsky District, Bryansk Oblast, a settlement in Krasnoselsky Selsoviet of Vygonichsky District

Republic of Buryatia
As of 2010, two rural localities in the Republic of Buryatia bear this name:
Pokrovka, Bichursky District, Republic of Buryatia, a selo in Gochitsky Selsoviet of Bichursky District
Pokrovka, Pribaykalsky District, Republic of Buryatia, a selo in Itantsinsky Selsoviet of Pribaykalsky District

Chelyabinsk Oblast
As of 2010, one rural locality in Chelyabinsk Oblast bears this name:
Pokrovka, Chelyabinsk Oblast, a village under the administrative jurisdiction of  the work settlement of  Suleya, Satkinsky District

Irkutsk Oblast
As of 2010, three rural localities in Irkutsk Oblast bear this name:
Pokrovka, Tayshetsky District, Irkutsk Oblast, a village in Tayshetsky District
Pokrovka, Ziminsky District, Irkutsk Oblast, a selo in Ziminsky District
Pokrovka, Bayandayevsky District, Irkutsk Oblast, a village in Bayandayevsky District

Kaluga Oblast
As of 2010, one rural locality in Kaluga Oblast bears this name:
Pokrovka, Kaluga Oblast, a village in Kozelsky District

Kemerovo Oblast
As of 2010, two rural localities in Kemerovo Oblast bear this name:
Pokrovka, Chebulinsky District, Kemerovo Oblast, a village under the administrative jurisdiction of  the urban-type settlement of Verkh-Chebula, Chebulinsky District
Pokrovka, Leninsk-Kuznetsky District, Kemerovo Oblast, a village in Shabanovskaya Rural Territory of Leninsk-Kuznetsky District

Khabarovsk Krai
As of 2010, one rural locality in Khabarovsk Krai bears this name:
Pokrovka, Khabarovsk Krai, a selo in Bikinsky District

Krasnoyarsk Krai
As of 2014, nine rural localities in Krasnoyarsk Krai bear this name:
Pokrovka, Abansky District, Krasnoyarsk Krai, a selo in Pokrovsky Selsoviet of Abansky District
Pokrovka (selo), Tarutinsky Selsoviet, Achinsky District, Krasnoyarsk Krai, a selo in Tarutinsky Selsoviet of Achinsky District
Pokrovka (settlement), Tarutinsky Selsoviet, Achinsky District, Krasnoyarsk Krai, a settlement in Tarutinsky Selsoviet of Achinsky District
Pokrovka, Bolshemurtinsky District, Krasnoyarsk Krai, a village in Predivinsky Selsoviet of Bolshemurtinsky District
Pokrovka, Nizhneingashsky District, Krasnoyarsk Krai, a village in Sokolovsky Selsoviet of Nizhneingashsky District
Pokrovka, Tyukhtetsky District, Krasnoyarsk Krai, a village in Tyukhtetsky Selsoviet of Tyukhtetsky District
Pokrovka, Uyarsky District, Krasnoyarsk Krai, a village in Avdinsky Selsoviet of Uyarsky District
Pokrovka, Yemelyanovsky District, Krasnoyarsk Krai, a village in Talsky Selsoviet of Yemelyanovsky District
Pokrovka, Yermakovsky District, Krasnoyarsk Krai, a village in Tanzybeysky Selsoviet of Yermakovsky District

Kurgan Oblast
As of 2010, four rural localities in Kurgan Oblast bear this name:
Pokrovka, Kureinsky Selsoviet, Makushinsky District, Kurgan Oblast, a village in Kureinsky Selsoviet of Makushinsky District
Pokrovka, Tryukhinsky Selsoviet, Makushinsky District, Kurgan Oblast, a village in Tryukhinsky Selsoviet of Makushinsky District
Pokrovka, Pritobolny District, Kurgan Oblast, a village in Davydovsky Selsoviet of Pritobolny District
Pokrovka, Safakulevsky District, Kurgan Oblast, a village in Kamyshinsky Selsoviet of Safakulevsky District

Kursk Oblast
As of 2010, one rural locality in Kursk Oblast bears this name:
Pokrovka, Kursk Oblast, a village in Prilepsky Selsoviet of Pristensky District

Leningrad Oblast
As of 2010, two rural localities in Leningrad Oblast bear this name:
Pokrovka, Gatchinsky District, Leningrad Oblast, a village in Kobrinskoye Settlement Municipal Formation of Gatchinsky District
Pokrovka, Luzhsky District, Leningrad Oblast, a village in Mshinskoye Settlement Municipal Formation of Luzhsky District

Lipetsk Oblast
As of 2010, six rural localities in Lipetsk Oblast bear this name:
Pokrovka, Chaplyginsky District, Lipetsk Oblast, a village in Lozovsky Selsoviet of Chaplyginsky District
Pokrovka, Dankovsky District, Lipetsk Oblast, a village in Plakhovsky Selsoviet of Dankovsky District
Pokrovka, Petrovsky Selsoviet, Dobrinsky District, Lipetsk Oblast, a village in Petrovsky Selsoviet of Dobrinsky District
Pokrovka, Tikhvinsky Selsoviet, Dobrinsky District, Lipetsk Oblast, a village in Tikhvinsky Selsoviet of Dobrinsky District
Pokrovka, Krasninsky District, Lipetsk Oblast, a selo in Drezgalovsky Selsoviet of Krasninsky District
Pokrovka, Lebedyansky District, Lipetsk Oblast, a village in Vyazovsky Selsoviet of Lebedyansky District

Mari El Republic
As of 2010, one rural locality in the Mari El Republic bears this name:
Pokrovka, Mari El Republic, a village in Ruemsky Rural Okrug of Medvedevsky District

Moscow Oblast
As of 2010, three rural localities in Moscow Oblast bear this name:
Pokrovka, Klinsky District, Moscow Oblast, a village under the administrative jurisdiction of the town of Klin in Klinsky District
Pokrovka, Ateptsevskoye Rural Settlement, Naro-Fominsky District, Moscow Oblast, a village in Ateptsevskoye Rural Settlement of Naro-Fominsky District
Pokrovka, Tashirovskoye Rural Settlement, Naro-Fominsky District, Moscow Oblast, a khutor in Tashirovskoye Rural Settlement of Naro-Fominsky District

Nizhny Novgorod Oblast
As of 2010, eight rural localities in Nizhny Novgorod Oblast bear this name:
Pokrovka, Arzamassky District, Nizhny Novgorod Oblast, a village in Lomovsky Selsoviet of Arzamassky District
Pokrovka, Koverninsky District, Nizhny Novgorod Oblast, a village in Gorevsky Selsoviet of Koverninsky District
Pokrovka, Lukoyanovsky District, Nizhny Novgorod Oblast, a selo under the administrative jurisdiction of  the work settlement of imeni Stepana Razina, Lukoyanovsky District
Pokrovka, Lyskovsky District, Nizhny Novgorod Oblast, a village in Kislovsky Selsoviet of Lyskovsky District
Pokrovka, Shatkovsky District, Nizhny Novgorod Oblast, a settlement under the administrative jurisdiction of the work settlement of Shatki in Shatkovsky District
Pokrovka, Vorotynsky District, Nizhny Novgorod Oblast, a village in Ognev-Maydansky Selsoviet of Vorotynsky District
Pokrovka, Voznesensky District, Nizhny Novgorod Oblast, a village in Blagodatovsky Selsoviet of Voznesensky District
Pokrovka, Vyksunsky District, Nizhny Novgorod Oblast, a village in Novodmitriyevsky Selsoviet of Vyksunsky District

Novgorod Oblast
As of 2010, two rural localities in Novgorod Oblast bear this name:
Pokrovka, Batetsky District, Novgorod Oblast, a village in Peredolskoye Settlement of Batetsky District
Pokrovka, Demyansky District, Novgorod Oblast, a village in Pesotskoye Settlement of Demyansky District

Novosibirsk Oblast
As of 2010, seven rural localities in Novosibirsk Oblast bear this name:
Pokrovka, Chanovsky District, Novosibirsk Oblast, a selo in Chanovsky District
Pokrovka, Chistoozyorny District, Novosibirsk Oblast, a selo in Chistoozyorny District
Pokrovka, Dovolensky District, Novosibirsk Oblast, a selo in Dovolensky District
Pokrovka, Karasuksky District, Novosibirsk Oblast, a settlement in Karasuksky District
Pokrovka, Kochkovsky District, Novosibirsk Oblast, a settlement in Kochkovsky District
Pokrovka, Kupinsky District, Novosibirsk Oblast, a village in Kupinsky District
Pokrovka, Ust-Tarksky District, Novosibirsk Oblast, a village in Ust-Tarksky District

Omsk Oblast
As of 2010, four rural localities in Omsk Oblast bear this name:
Pokrovka, Lyubinsky District, Omsk Oblast, a village in Zameletenovsky Rural Okrug of Lyubinsky District
Pokrovka, Nazyvayevsky District, Omsk Oblast, a selo in Pokrovsky Rural Okrug of Nazyvayevsky District
Pokrovka, Nizhneomsky District, Omsk Oblast, a village in Sitnikovsky Rural Okrug of Nizhneomsky District
Pokrovka, Omsky District, Omsk Oblast, a selo in Pokrovsky Rural Okrug of Omsky District

Orenburg Oblast
As of 2010, eleven rural localities in Orenburg Oblast bear this name:
Pokrovka, Abdulinsky District, Orenburg Oblast, a selo in Pokrovsky Selsoviet of Abdulinsky District
Pokrovka, Akbulaksky District, Orenburg Oblast, a selo in Michurinsky Selsoviet of Akbulaksky District
Pokrovka, Buzuluksky District, Orenburg Oblast, a selo in Lisyepolyansky Selsoviet of Buzuluksky District
Pokrovka, Grachyovsky District, Orenburg Oblast, a selo in Novonikolsky Selsoviet of Grachyovsky District
Pokrovka, Krasnogvardeysky District, Orenburg Oblast, a selo in Preobrazhensky Selsoviet of Krasnogvardeysky District
Pokrovka, Kurmanayevsky District, Orenburg Oblast, a selo in Pokrovsky Selsoviet of Kurmanayevsky District
Pokrovka, Kvarkensky District, Orenburg Oblast, a selo in Uralsky Selsoviet of Kvarkensky District
Pokrovka, Novosergiyevsky District, Orenburg Oblast, a selo in Pokrovsky Selsoviet of Novosergiyevsky District
Pokrovka, Sharlyksky District, Orenburg Oblast, a selo in Slonovsky Selsoviet of Sharlyksky District
Pokrovka, Sol-Iletsky District, Orenburg Oblast, a selo in Pokrovsky Selsoviet of Sol-Iletsky District
Pokrovka, Sorochinsky District, Orenburg Oblast, a selo in Voykovsky Selsoviet of Sorochinsky District

Oryol Oblast
As of 2010, two rural localities in Oryol Oblast bear this name:
Pokrovka, Kolpnyansky District, Oryol Oblast, a village in Karlovsky Selsoviet of Kolpnyansky District
Pokrovka, Novosilsky District, Oryol Oblast, a settlement in Golunsky Selsoviet of Novosilsky District

Penza Oblast
As of 2010, four rural localities in Penza Oblast bear this name:
Pokrovka, Bekovsky District, Penza Oblast, a selo in Pyashinsky Selsoviet of Bekovsky District
Pokrovka, Kameshkirsky District, Penza Oblast, a selo in Pestrovsky Selsoviet of Kameshkirsky District
Pokrovka, Nikolsky District, Penza Oblast, a village in Maissky Selsoviet of Nikolsky District
Pokrovka, Pachelmsky District, Penza Oblast, a selo in Sheynsky Selsoviet of Pachelmsky District

Perm Krai
As of 2010, three rural localities in Perm Krai bear this name:
Pokrovka, Beryozovsky District, Perm Krai, a selo in Beryozovsky District
Pokrovka, Chernushinsky District, Perm Krai, a village in Chernushinsky District
Pokrovka, Osinsky District, Perm Krai, a village in Osinsky District

Primorsky Krai
As of 2010, three rural localities in Primorsky Krai bear this name:
Pokrovka, Krasnoarmeysky District, Primorsky Krai, a selo in Krasnoarmeysky District
Pokrovka, Oktyabrsky District, Primorsky Krai, a selo in Oktyabrsky District
Pokrovka, Yakovlevsky District, Primorsky Krai, a selo in Yakovlevsky District

Ryazan Oblast
As of 2010, one rural locality in Ryazan Oblast bears this name:
Pokrovka, Ryazan Oblast, a village in Aleshinsky Rural Okrug of Rybnovsky District

Sakha Republic
As of 2010, one rural locality in the Sakha Republic bears this name:
Pokrovka, Sakha Republic, a selo in Maysky Rural Okrug of Amginsky District

Sakhalin Oblast
As of 2010, one rural locality in Sakhalin Oblast bears this name:
Pokrovka, Sakhalin Oblast, a selo in Dolinsky District

Samara Oblast
As of 2010, six rural localities in Samara Oblast bear this name:
Pokrovka, Bezenchuksky District, Samara Oblast, a selo in Bezenchuksky District
Pokrovka, Borsky District, Samara Oblast, a selo in Borsky District
Pokrovka (Ozerki Rural Settlement), Chelno-Vershinsky District, Samara Oblast, a settlement in Chelno-Vershinsky District; municipally, a part of Ozerki Rural Settlement of that district
Pokrovka (Devlezerkino Rural Settlement), Chelno-Vershinsky District, Samara Oblast, a settlement in Chelno-Vershinsky District; municipally, a part of Devlezerkino Rural Settlement of that district
Pokrovka, Kinelsky District, Samara Oblast, a selo in Kinelsky District
Pokrovka, Neftegorsky District, Samara Oblast, a selo in Neftegorsky District

Saratov Oblast
As of 2010, one rural locality in Saratov Oblast bears this name:
Pokrovka, Saratov Oblast, a selo in Volsky District

Smolensk Oblast
As of 2010, one rural locality in Smolensk Oblast bears this name:
Pokrovka, Smolensk Oblast, a village in Muryginskoye Rural Settlement of Pochinkovsky District

Tambov Oblast
As of 2010, four rural localities in Tambov Oblast bear this name:
Pokrovka, Inzhavinsky District, Tambov Oblast, a village in Mikhaylovsky Selsoviet of Inzhavinsky District
Pokrovka, Muchkapsky District, Tambov Oblast, a selo in Troitsky Selsoviet of Muchkapsky District
Pokrovka, Sosnovsky District, Tambov Oblast, a settlement in Olkhovsky Selsoviet of Sosnovsky District
Pokrovka, Uvarovsky District, Tambov Oblast, a settlement in Nizhneshibryaysky Selsoviet of Uvarovsky District

Republic of Tatarstan
As of 2010, three rural localities in the Republic of Tatarstan bear this name:
Pokrovka, Muslyumovsky District, Republic of Tatarstan, a selo in Muslyumovsky District
Pokrovka, Spassky District, Republic of Tatarstan, a selo in Spassky District
Pokrovka, Verkhneuslonsky District, Republic of Tatarstan, a village in Verkhneuslonsky District

Tver Oblast
As of 2010, two rural localities in Tver Oblast bear this name:
Pokrovka, Likhoslavlsky District, Tver Oblast, a village in Likhoslavlsky District
Pokrovka, Selizharovsky District, Tver Oblast, a village in Selizharovsky District

Tyumen Oblast
As of 2010, four rural localities in Tyumen Oblast bear this name:
Pokrovka, Sladkovsky District, Tyumen Oblast, a village in Usovsky Rural Okrug of Sladkovsky District
Pokrovka, Sorokinsky District, Tyumen Oblast, a selo in Pokrovsky Rural Okrug of Sorokinsky District
Pokrovka, Vikulovsky District, Tyumen Oblast, a selo in Sartamsky Rural Okrug of Vikulovsky District
Pokrovka, Zavodoukovsky District, Tyumen Oblast, a village in Zavodoukovsky District

Vladimir Oblast
As of 2010, one rural locality in Vladimir Oblast bears this name:
Pokrovka, Vladimir Oblast, a village in Kolchuginsky District

Volgograd Oblast
As of 2010, one rural locality in Volgograd Oblast bears this name:
Pokrovka, Volgograd Oblast, a selo in Pokrovsky Selsoviet of Leninsky District

Voronezh Oblast
As of 2010, four rural localities in Voronezh Oblast bear this name:
Pokrovka, Ostrogozhsky District, Voronezh Oblast, a selo in Korotoyakskoye Rural Settlement of Ostrogozhsky District
Pokrovka, Pavlovsky District, Voronezh Oblast, a selo in Pokrovskoye Rural Settlement of Pavlovsky District
Pokrovka, Podgorensky District, Voronezh Oblast, a khutor in Pervomayskoye Rural Settlement of Podgorensky District
Pokrovka, Verkhnekhavsky District, Voronezh Oblast, a village in Plyasovatskoye Rural Settlement of Verkhnekhavsky District

Zabaykalsky Krai
As of 2010, one rural locality in Zabaykalsky Krai bears this name:
Pokrovka, Zabaykalsky Krai, a selo in Mogochinsky District